A slub in textiles production refers to thickened areas of a fiber or yarn. Slubbed or slubby fabric is woven from slubby yarn (yarn with a very variable diameter). Both high and low slubbiness may be sought.

Slubs in spun fibers may be produced deliberately by varying spinning tension (see Novelty yarns#Slub). They are also produced when short, staple fibers are spun into a single yarn. Slubs may be valued or deliberately produced for aesthetic effect, but they may also be regarded as a defect caused by either uneven spinning or using low-grade, lumpy or short-staple fiber.

Types
Slubby cotton fabric includes:
Madras (cloth), woven from short-staple cotton
Some denim used for jeans; the slubs cause the cloth to fade unevenly, in a pattern called 

Linen is often slubbed. Wool fabrics, such as tweeds, may also be slubbed.

Silk is a filament fiber, and the only natural fiber type to come in filament length naturally (strands can be over 1.5 km long). However, some silk fibers are shorter in length, and must therefore be processed as shorter-staple fibers, not as filament fibers, to make cloth. These shorter  fibers, known as silk noil, may also be used unspun (for instance, as wadding in a quilted garment), but are often plied into threads (which are then at least twice as thick as the filament) and used in the production of slubbed silks. Slubbed silks include:

Pongee
Shantung (fabric)
Dupioni

Thai silk
Some tussah silk
Eri silk

Slubby mixed-fiber fabric include:
Bourette
"Antique" satin

Synthetic fibers can readily be produced in filament form, as very long lengths of consistent diameter, but it is sometimes slubbed for effect.

References

Textiles